Birayma N'dyeme Eter (ruled c.1465–c.1481) was the seventh ruler, or Burba, of the Jolof Empire.

References

15th-century monarchs in Africa
Year of birth missing
1481 deaths